Bayburt is an electoral district of the Grand National Assembly of Turkey. It elects one member of parliament (deputies) to represent the province of the same name for a five-year term, using the D'Hondt method, a party-list proportional representation system. However, since it has only one seat, election is de facto first-past-the-post.

Members 
Population reviews of each electoral district are conducted before each general election, which can lead to certain districts being granted a smaller or greater number of parliamentary seats. Bayburt elected two Members of Parliament between 1999 and 2007. However, with population growth not keeping up with the rest of the country, Bayburt became Turkey's only single-member electoral constituency for the 2011 general election. Ülkü Gökalp Güney won the most votes in the 2002 general election and joined the AKP in order to contest the 2007 general election.

General elections

2011

June 2015

November 2015

2018

Presidential elections

2014

References 

Electoral districts of Turkey
Politics of Bayburt Province